Karl Cart (15 May 1906 – 14 August 1988) was an Austrian footballer. He played in two matches for the Austria national football team from 1926 to 1928.

References

External links
 
 

1906 births
1988 deaths
Austrian footballers
Austria international footballers
Footballers from Vienna
1. Simmeringer SC players
Association football goalkeepers
FC Admira Wacker Mödling players